Thomas W. Krise, Ph.D., (born 1961) is an American academic, university administrator, and retired military officer.  He was elected the 11th President of the University of Guam and assumed office on August 6, 2018. He is also president emeritus of Pacific Lutheran University in Tacoma, Washington, United States.

Early life and education
The son and grandson of U.S. Army medical service officers, he was born the youngest of three children of Elizabeth Ann Krise (née Bradt; 1928-2015) and Colonel Edward Fisher Krise (1924-2003) on October 27, 1961, at Fort Sam Houston in San Antonio, Texas, and raised in the U.S. Virgin Islands. Krise graduated in 1979 from All Saints Cathedral School on St Thomas, Virgin Islands. He earned a B.S. in history from the United States Air Force Academy, an M.S.A. in management from Central Michigan University, an M.A. in English from the University of Minnesota, and a Ph.D. in English  in 1995 from the University of Chicago.

Military career
He served more than twenty years on active duty in the U.S. Air Force, retiring with the rank of lieutenant colonel.  He served as an ICBM flight commander in the Strategic Air Command, on the faculty of the Air Force Academy in Colorado Springs, as a senior military fellow of the Institute for National Strategic Studies in Washington, as vice director of the National Defense University Press, and as founder and first director of the Air Force Humanities Institute.

Academic career
Formerly, he was dean of the College of the Pacific, the arts and sciences college of the University of the Pacific in Stockton, California,  and Chair of the Department of English at the University of Central Florida in Orlando.
 
Krise was the founding president of the Early Caribbean Society, past president of the Society of Early Americanists, and a former Fulbright Scholar at the University of the West Indies in Jamaica.  He has served as general editor of the McNair Papers monograph series, managing editor of War, Literature, and the Arts: An International Journal of the Humanities, and published numerous articles and other works, including Caribbeana: An Anthology of English Literature of the West Indies, 1657-1777 and Literary Histories of the Early Anglophone Caribbean: Islands in the Stream, the latter co-edited with Nicole Aljoe and Brycchan Carey.

Personal life
Krise lives in Tamuning, Guam, with his wife, retired automotive executive Patricia L. Krise (née Love), who serves on the board of the Guam Council of the Arts and Humanities Agency.

References

1961 births
Living people
United States Air Force Academy alumni
Central Michigan University alumni
University of Minnesota College of Liberal Arts alumni
University of Chicago alumni
University of the Pacific (United States) people
University of Central Florida faculty
National Defense University faculty
Heads of universities and colleges in the United States
American academics of English literature
American academic administrators